Tom Shachtman (born 1942) is an American author, journalist, filmmaker, and educator. He has published more than thirty books across a variety of topics, including histories, biographies, and books for children. He lives in Connecticut.

Awards
Shachtman and British filmmaker David Dugan won the 2009 American Institute of Physics Science Writing Award for their two-part Nova documentary "Absolute Zero."

Books

Nonfiction
 The Day America Crashed: A Narrative Account of the Great Stock Market Crash of October 24, 1929 (1979, G. P. Putnam's Sons)
 Edith & Woodrow: A Presidential Romance (1981, G. P. Putnam's Sons)
 The Phony War, 1939–1940 (1982, Harper & Row)
 Decade of Shocks: Dallas to Watergate, 1963–1974 (1983, Poseidon Press)
 The FBI-KGB War: A Special Agent's Story, with Robert J. Lamphere (1986, Random House)
 The Gilded Leaf: Triumph, Tragedy, and Tobacco: Three Generations of the R. J. Reynolds Family and Fortune, with Patrick Reynolds (1989, Little, Brown)
 Straight to the Top: Beyond Loyalty, Gamesmanship, Mentors, and Other Corporate Myths, with Paul G. Stern (1990, Warner Books)
 Image by Design: From Corporate Vision to Business Reality, with Clive Chajet (1991, Addison-Wesley)
 Skyscraper Dreams: The Great Real Estate Dynasties of New York (1991, Little, Brown)
 Whoever Fights Monsters: Inside the Minds of the World's Most Notorious Serial Killers, with Robert K. Ressler (1992, St. Martin's Press)
 Justice Is Served, with Robert K. Ressler (1994, St. Martin's Press)
 The Inarticulate Society: Eloquence and Culture in America (1995, Free Press)
 I Have Lived in the Monster: A Report from the Abyss, with Robert K. Ressler (1997, St. Martin's Press)
 The Most Beautiful Villages of New England, with photographs by Len Rubenstein (1997, Thames & Hudson)
 Around the Block: The Business of a Neighborhood (1997, Harcourt Brace)
 Absolute Zero and the Conquest of Cold (1999, Houghton Mifflin)
 Torpedoed: An American Businessman's True Story of Secrets, Betrayal, Imprisonment in Russia, and the Battle to Set Him Free, with Edmond D. Pope (2001, Little, Brown)
 I Seek My Brethren: Ralph Goldman and "The Joint": The Work of the American Jewish Joint Distribution Committee (2001, Newmarket Press)
 Terrors and Marvels: How Science and Technology Changed the Character and outcome of World War II (2002, William Morrow)
 25 to Life: The Truth, the Whole Truth, and Nothing but the Truth, with Leslie Crocker Snyder (2002, Warner Books)
 Rumspringa: To Be or Not to Be Amish (2006, North Point Press)
 Dead Center: Behind the Scenes at the World's Largest Medical Examiner's Office, with Shiya Ribowsky (2006, Regan)
 Airlift to America: How Barack Obama, Sr., John F. Kennedy, Tom Mboya, and 800 East African Students Changed Their World and Ours (2009, St. Martin's Press)
 The Forty Years War: The Rise and Fall of the Neocons, from Nixon to Obama, with Len Colodny (2010, Harper)
 Building Tall: My Life and the Invention of Construction Management: A Memoir, with John L. Tishman (2010, University of Michigan Press)
 American Iconoclast: The Life and Times of Eric Hoffer (2011, Hopewell)
 Gentlemen Scientists and Revolutionaries: The Founding Fathers in the Age of Enlightenment (2014, Palgrave Macmillan)
 How The French Saved America: Soldiers, Sailors, Diplomats, Louis XVI, and The Success of a Revolution (2017, Palgrave Macmillan)
The Founding Fortunes: How the Wealthy Paid for and Profited from America's Revolution (2020, St. Martin's Press)

Books for Children
 Growing Up Masai (1981, Macmillan)
 The Birdman of St. Petersburg: Ralph T. Heath, Jr. (1982, Macmillan)
 Parade!, with photographs by Chuck Saaf (1985, Macmillan)
 America's Birthday: The Fourth of July, with photographs by Chuck Saaf (1986, Macmillan)
 Beachmaster: A Story of Daniel Au Fond (1988, Henry Holt & Co.)
 Video Power: A Complete Guide to Writing, Planning, and Shooting Videos, with Harriet Shelare (1988, Henry Holt & Co.)
 Wavebender: A Story of Daniel Au Fond (1989, Henry Holt & Co.)
 The President Builds a House (1989, Simon & Schuster)
 Driftwhistler: A Story of Daniel Au Fond (1991, Henry Holt & Co.)

References

1942 births
Living people
Date of birth missing (living people)
Place of birth missing (living people)
American male writers